The atomic bombings of Hiroshima and Nagasaki were the detonation of two atomic bombs over the Japanese cities of Hiroshima and Nagasaki on 6 and 9 August 1945 by the United States. The two bombings killed between 129,000 and 226,000 people, most of whom were civilians, and remain the only use of nuclear weapons in an armed conflict. Japan surrendered to the Allies on 15 August, six days after the bombing of Nagasaki and the Soviet Union's declaration of war against Japan. The Japanese government signed the instrument of surrender on 2 September, effectively ending the war. 

In the final year of World War II, the Allies prepared for a costly invasion of the Japanese mainland. This undertaking was preceded by a conventional and firebombing campaign that devastated 64 Japanese cities. The war in the European theatre concluded when Germany surrendered on 8 May 1945, and the Allies turned their full attention to the Pacific War. By July 1945, the Allies' Manhattan Project had produced two types of atomic bombs: "Fat Man", a plutonium implosion-type nuclear weapon; and "Little Boy", an enriched uranium gun-type fission weapon. The 509th Composite Group of the United States Army Air Forces was trained and equipped with the specialized Silverplate version of the Boeing B-29 Superfortress, and deployed to Tinian in the Mariana Islands. The Allies called for the unconditional surrender of the Imperial Japanese armed forces in the Potsdam Declaration on 26 July 1945, the alternative being "prompt and utter destruction". The Japanese government ignored the ultimatum.

The consent of the United Kingdom was obtained for the bombing, as was required by the Quebec Agreement, and orders were issued on 25 July by General Thomas Handy, the acting Chief of Staff of the United States Army, for atomic bombs to be used against Hiroshima, Kokura, Niigata, and Nagasaki. These targets were chosen because they were large urban areas that also held militarily significant facilities. On 6 August, a Little Boy was dropped on Hiroshima, to which Prime Minister Suzuki reiterated the Japanese government's commitment to ignore the Allies' demands and fight on. Three days later, a Fat Man was dropped on Nagasaki. Over the next two to four months, the effects of the atomic bombings killed between 90,000 and 146,000 people in Hiroshima and 60,000 and 80,000 people in Nagasaki; roughly half occurred on the first day. For months afterward, many people continued to die from the effects of burns, radiation sickness, and injuries, compounded by illness and malnutrition. Though Hiroshima had a sizable military garrison, most of the dead were civilians.

Japan surrendered to the Allies on 15 August, six days after the Soviet Union's declaration of war and the bombing of Nagasaki. The Japanese government signed the instrument of surrender on 2 September, effectively ending the war. Scholars have extensively studied the effects of the bombings on the social and political character of subsequent world history and popular culture, and there is still much debate concerning the ethical and legal justification for the bombings. Supporters claim that the atomic bombings were necessary to bring an end to the war with minimal American casualties; critics believe that the bombings were unnecessary and a war crime, and highlight the moral and ethical implications of the intentional nuclear attack on civilians.

Background

Pacific War 

In 1945, the Pacific War between the Empire of Japan and the Allies entered its fourth year. Most Japanese military units fought fiercely, ensuring that the Allied victory would come at an enormous cost. The 1.25 million battle casualties incurred in total by the United States in World War II included both military personnel killed in action and wounded in action. Nearly one million of the casualties occurred during the last year of the war, from June 1944 to June 1945. In December 1944, American battle casualties hit an all-time monthly high of 88,000 as a result of the German Ardennes Offensive. America's reserves of manpower were running out. Deferments for groups such as agricultural workers were tightened, and there was consideration of drafting women. At the same time, the public was becoming war-weary, and demanding that long-serving servicemen be sent home.

In the Pacific, the Allies returned to the Philippines, recaptured Burma, and invaded Borneo. Offensives were undertaken to reduce the Japanese forces remaining in Bougainville, New Guinea and the Philippines. In April 1945, American forces landed on Okinawa, where heavy fighting continued until June. Along the way, the ratio of Japanese to American casualties dropped from five to one in the Philippines to two to one on Okinawa. Although some Japanese soldiers were taken prisoner, most fought until they were killed or committed suicide. Nearly 99 percent of the 21,000 defenders of Iwo Jima were killed. Of the 117,000 Okinawan and Japanese troops defending Okinawa in April to June 1945, 94 percent were killed; 7,401 Japanese soldiers surrendered, an unprecedentedly large number.

As the Allies advanced towards Japan, conditions became steadily worse for the Japanese people. Japan's merchant fleet declined from 5,250,000 gross tons in 1941 to 1,560,000 tons in March 1945, and 557,000 tons in August 1945. Lack of raw materials forced the Japanese war economy into a steep decline after the middle of 1944. The civilian economy, which had slowly deteriorated throughout the war, reached disastrous levels by the middle of 1945. The loss of shipping also affected the fishing fleet, and the 1945 catch was only 22 percent of that in 1941. The 1945 rice harvest was the worst since 1909, and hunger and malnutrition became widespread. U.S. industrial production was overwhelmingly superior to Japan's. By 1943, the U.S. produced almost 100,000 aircraft a year, compared to Japan's production of 70,000 for the entire war. In February 1945, Prince Fumimaro Konoe advised Emperor Hirohito that defeat was inevitable, and urged him to abdicate.

Preparations to invade Japan 

Even before the surrender of Nazi Germany on 8 May 1945, plans were underway for the largest operation of the Pacific War, Operation Downfall, the Allied invasion of Japan. The operation had two parts: Operation Olympic and Operation Coronet. Set to begin in October 1945, Olympic involved a series of landings by the U.S. Sixth Army intended to capture the southern third of the southernmost main Japanese island, Kyūshū. Operation Olympic was to be followed in March 1946 by Operation Coronet, the capture of the Kantō Plain, near Tokyo on the main Japanese island of Honshū by the U.S. First, Eighth and Tenth Armies, as well as a Commonwealth Corps made up of Australian, British and Canadian divisions. The target date was chosen to allow for Olympic to complete its objectives, for troops to be redeployed from Europe, and the Japanese winter to pass.

Japan's geography made this invasion plan obvious to the Japanese; they were able to predict the Allied invasion plans accurately and thus adjust their defensive plan, Operation Ketsugō, accordingly. The Japanese planned an all-out defense of Kyūshū, with little left in reserve for any subsequent defense operations. Four veteran divisions were withdrawn from the Kwantung Army in Manchuria in March 1945 to strengthen the forces in Japan, and 45 new divisions were activated between February and May 1945. Most were immobile formations for coastal defense, but 16 were high quality mobile divisions. In all, there were 2.3 million Japanese Army troops prepared to defend the home islands, backed by a civilian militia of 28 million men and women. Casualty predictions varied widely, but were extremely high. The Vice Chief of the Imperial Japanese Navy General Staff, Vice Admiral Takijirō Ōnishi, predicted up to 20 million Japanese deaths.

On 15 June 1945, a study by the Joint War Plans Committee, who provided planning information to the Joint Chiefs of Staff, estimated that Olympic would result in 130,000 to 220,000 U.S. casualties, with U.S. dead in the range from 25,000 to 46,000. Delivered on 15 June 1945, after insight gained from the Battle of Okinawa, the study noted Japan's inadequate defenses due to the very effective sea blockade and the American firebombing campaign. The Chief of Staff of the United States Army, General of the Army George Marshall, and the Army Commander in Chief in the Pacific, General of the Army Douglas MacArthur, signed documents agreeing with the Joint War Plans Committee estimate.

The Americans were alarmed by the Japanese buildup, which was accurately tracked through Ultra intelligence. Secretary of War Henry L. Stimson was sufficiently concerned about high American estimates of probable casualties to commission his own study by Quincy Wright and William Shockley. Wright and Shockley spoke with Colonels James McCormack and Dean Rusk, and examined casualty forecasts by Michael E. DeBakey and Gilbert Beebe. Wright and Shockley estimated the invading Allies would suffer between 1.7 and 4 million casualties in such a scenario, of whom between 400,000 and 800,000 would be dead, while Japanese fatalities would have been around 5 to 10 million.

Marshall began contemplating the use of a weapon that was "readily available and which assuredly can decrease the cost in American lives": poison gas. Quantities of phosgene, mustard gas, tear gas and cyanogen chloride were moved to Luzon from stockpiles in Australia and New Guinea in preparation for Operation Olympic, and MacArthur ensured that Chemical Warfare Service units were trained in their use. Consideration was also given to using biological weapons against Japan.

Air raids on Japan 

While the United States had developed plans for an air campaign against Japan prior to the Pacific War, the capture of Allied bases in the western Pacific in the first weeks of the conflict meant that this offensive did not begin until mid-1944 when the long-ranged Boeing B-29 Superfortress became ready for use in combat. Operation Matterhorn involved India-based B-29s staging through bases around Chengdu in China to make a series of raids on strategic targets in Japan. This effort failed to achieve the strategic objectives that its planners had intended, largely because of logistical problems, the bomber's mechanical difficulties, the vulnerability of Chinese staging bases, and the extreme range required to reach key Japanese cities.

Brigadier General Haywood S. Hansell determined that Guam, Tinian, and Saipan in the Mariana Islands would better serve as B-29 bases, but they were in Japanese hands. Strategies were shifted to accommodate the air war, and the islands were captured between June and August 1944. Air bases were developed, and B-29 operations commenced from the Marianas in October 1944. These bases were easily resupplied by cargo ships. The XXI Bomber Command began missions against Japan on 18 November 1944. The early attempts to bomb Japan from the Marianas proved just as ineffective as the China-based B-29s had been. Hansell continued the practice of conducting so-called high-altitude precision bombing, aimed at key industries and transportation networks, even after these tactics had not produced acceptable results. These efforts proved unsuccessful due to logistical difficulties with the remote location, technical problems with the new and advanced aircraft, unfavorable weather conditions, and enemy action.

Hansell's successor, Major General Curtis LeMay, assumed command in January 1945 and initially continued to use the same precision bombing tactics, with equally unsatisfactory results. The attacks initially targeted key industrial facilities but much of the Japanese manufacturing process was carried out in small workshops and private homes. Under pressure from United States Army Air Forces (USAAF) headquarters in Washington, LeMay changed tactics and decided that low-level incendiary raids against Japanese cities were the only way to destroy their production capabilities, shifting from precision bombing to area bombardment with incendiaries. Like most strategic bombing during World War II, the aim of the air offensive against Japan was to destroy the enemy's war industries, kill or disable civilian employees of these industries, and undermine civilian morale.

Over the next six months, the XXI Bomber Command under LeMay firebombed 64 Japanese cities. The firebombing of Tokyo, codenamed Operation Meetinghouse, on 9–10 March killed an estimated 100,000 people and destroyed  of the city and 267,000 buildings in a single night. It was the deadliest bombing raid of the war, at a cost of 20 B-29s shot down by flak and fighters. By May, 75 percent of bombs dropped were incendiaries designed to burn down Japan's "paper cities". By mid-June, Japan's six largest cities had been devastated. The end of the fighting on Okinawa that month provided airfields even closer to the Japanese mainland, allowing the bombing campaign to be further escalated. Aircraft flying from Allied aircraft carriers and the Ryukyu Islands also regularly struck targets in Japan during 1945 in preparation for Operation Downfall. Firebombing switched to smaller cities, with populations ranging from 60,000 to 350,000. According to Yuki Tanaka, the U.S. fire-bombed over a hundred Japanese towns and cities. These raids were devastating.

The Japanese military was unable to stop the Allied attacks and the country's civil defense preparations proved inadequate. Japanese fighters and anti-aircraft guns had difficulty engaging bombers flying at high altitude. From April 1945, the Japanese interceptors also had to face American fighter escorts based on Iwo Jima and Okinawa. That month, the Imperial Japanese Army Air Service and Imperial Japanese Navy Air Service stopped attempting to intercept the air raids to preserve fighter aircraft to counter the expected invasion. By mid-1945 the Japanese only occasionally scrambled aircraft to intercept individual B-29s conducting reconnaissance sorties over the country, to conserve supplies of fuel. In July 1945, the Japanese had  of avgas stockpiled for the invasion of Japan. About  had been consumed in the home islands area in April, May and June 1945. While the Japanese military decided to resume attacks on Allied bombers from late June, by this time there were too few operational fighters available for this change of tactics to hinder the Allied air raids.

Atomic bomb development 

The discovery of nuclear fission by German chemists Otto Hahn and Fritz Strassmann in 1938, and its theoretical explanation by Lise Meitner and Otto Frisch, made the development of an atomic bomb a theoretical possibility. Fears that a German atomic bomb project would develop atomic weapons first, especially among scientists who were refugees from Nazi Germany and other fascist countries, were expressed in the Einstein–Szilard letter in 1939. This prompted preliminary research in the United States in late 1939. Progress was slow until the arrival of the British MAUD Committee report in late 1941, which indicated that only 5 to 10 kilograms of isotopically enriched uranium-235 were needed for a bomb instead of tons of natural uranium and a neutron moderator like heavy water.

The 1943 Quebec Agreement merged the nuclear weapons projects of the United Kingdom and Canada, Tube Alloys and the Montreal Laboratory, with the Manhattan Project, under the direction of Major General Leslie R. Groves, Jr., of the U.S. Army Corps of Engineers. Groves appointed J. Robert Oppenheimer to organize and head the project's Los Alamos Laboratory in New Mexico, where bomb design work was carried out. Two types of bombs were eventually developed, both named by Robert Serber. Little Boy was a gun-type fission weapon that used uranium-235, a rare isotope of uranium separated at the Clinton Engineer Works at Oak Ridge, Tennessee. The other, known as a Fat Man device, was a more powerful and efficient, but more complicated, implosion-type nuclear weapon that used plutonium created in nuclear reactors at Hanford, Washington.

There was a Japanese nuclear weapon program, but it lacked the human, mineral and financial resources of the Manhattan Project, and never made much progress towards developing an atomic bomb.

Preparations

Organization and training 

The 509th Composite Group was constituted on 9 December 1944, and activated on 17 December 1944, at Wendover Army Air Field, Utah, commanded by Colonel Paul Tibbets. Tibbets was assigned to organize and command a combat group to develop the means of delivering an atomic weapon against targets in Germany and Japan. Because the flying squadrons of the group consisted of both bomber and transport aircraft, the group was designated as a "composite" rather than a "bombardment" unit. Working with the Manhattan Project at Los Alamos, Tibbets selected Wendover for his training base over Great Bend, Kansas, and Mountain Home, Idaho, because of its remoteness. Each bombardier completed at least 50 practice drops of inert or conventional explosive pumpkin bombs and Tibbets declared his group combat-ready. On 5 April 1945, the code name Operation Centerboard was assigned. The officer responsible for its allocation in the War Department's Operations Division was not cleared to know any details of it. The first bombing was later codenamed Operation Centerboard I, and the second, Operation Centerboard II.

The 509th Composite Group had an authorized strength of 225 officers and 1,542 enlisted men, almost all of whom eventually deployed to Tinian. In addition to its authorized strength, the 509th had attached to it on Tinian 51 civilian and military personnel from Project Alberta, known as the 1st Technical Detachment. The 509th Composite Group's 393d Bombardment Squadron was equipped with 15 Silverplate B-29s. These aircraft were specially adapted to carry nuclear weapons, and were equipped with fuel-injected engines, Curtiss Electric reversible-pitch propellers, pneumatic actuators for rapid opening and closing of bomb bay doors and other improvements.

The ground support echelon of the 509th Composite Group moved by rail on 26 April 1945, to its port of embarkation at Seattle, Washington. On 6 May the support elements sailed on the SS Cape Victory for the Marianas, while group materiel was shipped on the SS Emile Berliner. The Cape Victory made brief port calls at Honolulu and Eniwetok but the passengers were not permitted to leave the dock area. An advance party of the air echelon, consisting of 29 officers and 61 enlisted men, flew by C-54 to North Field on Tinian, between 15 and 22 May. There were also two representatives from Washington, D.C., Brigadier General Thomas Farrell, the deputy commander of the Manhattan Project, and Rear Admiral William R. Purnell of the Military Policy Committee, who were on hand to decide higher policy matters on the spot. Along with Captain William S. Parsons, the commander of Project Alberta, they became known as the "Tinian Joint Chiefs".

Choice of targets 

In April 1945, Marshall asked Groves to nominate specific targets for bombing for final approval by himself and Stimson. Groves formed a Target Committee, chaired by himself, that included Farrell, Major John A. Derry, Colonel William P. Fisher, Joyce C. Stearns and David M. Dennison from the USAAF; and scientists John von Neumann, Robert R. Wilson and William Penney from the Manhattan Project. The Target Committee met in Washington on 27 April; at Los Alamos on 10 May, where it was able to talk to the scientists and technicians there; and finally in Washington on 28 May, where it was briefed by Tibbets and Commander Frederick Ashworth from Project Alberta, and the Manhattan Project's scientific advisor, Richard C. Tolman.

The Target Committee nominated five targets: Kokura (now Kitakyushu), the site of one of Japan's largest munitions plants; Hiroshima, an embarkation port and industrial center that was the site of a major military headquarters; Yokohama, an urban center for aircraft manufacture, machine tools, docks, electrical equipment and oil refineries; Niigata, a port with industrial facilities including steel and aluminum plants and an oil refinery; and Kyoto, a major industrial center. The target selection was subject to the following criteria:
 The blast wave would create effective damage.
 The target was unlikely to be attacked by August 1945.

These cities were largely untouched during the nightly bombing raids, and the Army Air Forces agreed to leave them off the target list so accurate assessment of the damage caused by the atomic bombs could be made. Hiroshima was described as "an important army depot and port of embarkation in the middle of an urban industrial area. It is a good radar target and it is such a size that a large part of the city could be extensively damaged. There are adjacent hills which are likely to produce a focusing effect which would considerably increase the blast damage. Due to rivers it is not a good incendiary target."

The Target Committee stated that "It was agreed that psychological factors in the target selection were of great importance. Two aspects of this are (1) obtaining the greatest psychological effect against Japan and (2) making the initial use sufficiently spectacular for the importance of the weapon to be internationally recognized when publicity on it is released.... Kyoto has the advantage of the people being more highly intelligent and hence better able to appreciate the significance of the weapon. Hiroshima has the advantage of being such a size and with possible focussing from nearby mountains that a large fraction of the city may be destroyed. The Emperor's palace in Tokyo has a greater fame than any other target but is of least strategic value."

Edwin O. Reischauer, a Japan expert for the U.S. Army Intelligence Service, was incorrectly said to have prevented the bombing of Kyoto. In his autobiography, Reischauer specifically refuted this claim:

On 30 May, Stimson asked Groves to remove Kyoto from the target list due to its historical, religious and cultural significance, but Groves pointed to its military and industrial significance. Stimson then approached President Harry S. Truman about the matter. Truman agreed with Stimson, and Kyoto was temporarily removed from the target list. Groves attempted to restore Kyoto to the target list in July, but Stimson remained adamant. On 25 July, Nagasaki was put on the target list in place of Kyoto. It was a major military port, one of Japan's largest shipbuilding and repair centers, and an important producer of naval ordnance.

Proposed demonstration 
In early May 1945, the Interim Committee was created by Stimson at the urging of leaders of the Manhattan Project and with the approval of Truman to advise on matters pertaining to nuclear energy. During the meetings on 31 May and 1 June, scientist Ernest Lawrence had suggested giving the Japanese a non-combat demonstration. Arthur Compton later recalled that:

The possibility of a demonstration was raised again in the Franck Report issued by physicist James Franck on 11 June and the Scientific Advisory Panel rejected his report on 16 June, saying that "we can propose no technical demonstration likely to bring an end to the war; we see no acceptable alternative to direct military use." Franck then took the report to Washington, D.C., where the Interim Committee met on 21 June to re-examine its earlier conclusions; but it reaffirmed that there was no alternative to the use of the bomb on a military target.

Like Compton, many U.S. officials and scientists argued that a demonstration would sacrifice the shock value of the atomic attack, and the Japanese could deny the atomic bomb was lethal, making the mission less likely to produce surrender. Allied prisoners of war might be moved to the demonstration site and be killed by the bomb. They also worried that the bomb might be a failure, as the Trinity test was that of a stationary device, not an air-dropped bomb. In addition, although more bombs were in production, only two would be available at the start of August, and they cost billions of dollars, so using one for a demonstration would be expensive.

Leaflets 

For several months, the U.S. had warned civilians of potential air raids by dropping more than 63 million leaflets across Japan. Many Japanese cities suffered terrible damage from aerial bombings; some were as much as 97 percent destroyed. LeMay thought that leaflets would increase the psychological impact of bombing, and reduce the international stigma of area-bombing cities. Even with the warnings, Japanese opposition to the war remained ineffective. In general, the Japanese regarded the leaflet messages as truthful, with many Japanese choosing to leave major cities. The leaflets caused such concern that the government ordered the arrest of anyone caught in possession of a leaflet. Leaflet texts were prepared by recent Japanese prisoners of war because they were thought to be the best choice "to appeal to their compatriots".

In preparation for dropping an atomic bomb on Hiroshima, the Oppenheimer-led Scientific Panel of the Interim Committee decided against a demonstration bomb and against a special leaflet warning. Those decisions were implemented because of the uncertainty of a successful detonation and also because of the wish to maximize shock in the leadership. No warning was given to Hiroshima that a new and much more destructive bomb was going to be dropped. Various sources gave conflicting information about when the last leaflets were dropped on Hiroshima prior to the atomic bomb. Robert Jay Lifton wrote that it was 27 July, and Theodore H. McNelly wrote that it was 30 July. The USAAF history noted that eleven cities were targeted with leaflets on 27 July, but Hiroshima was not one of them, and there were no leaflet sorties on 30 July. Leaflet sorties were undertaken on 1 and 4 August. Hiroshima may have been leafleted in late July or early August, as survivor accounts talk about a delivery of leaflets a few days before the atomic bomb was dropped. Three versions were printed of a leaflet listing 11 or 12 cities targeted for firebombing; a total of 33 cities listed. With the text of this leaflet reading in Japanese "...we cannot promise that only these cities will be among those attacked..." Hiroshima was not listed.

Consultation with Britain and Canada 

In 1943, the United States and the United Kingdom signed the Quebec Agreement, which stipulated that nuclear weapons would not be used against another country without mutual consent. Stimson therefore had to obtain British permission. A meeting of the Combined Policy Committee, which included one Canadian representative, was held at the Pentagon on 4 July 1945. Field Marshal Sir Henry Maitland Wilson announced that the British government concurred with the use of nuclear weapons against Japan, which would be officially recorded as a decision of the Combined Policy Committee. As the release of information to third parties was also controlled by the Quebec Agreement, discussion then turned to what scientific details would be revealed in the press announcement of the bombing. The meeting also considered what Truman could reveal to Joseph Stalin, the leader of the Soviet Union, at the upcoming Potsdam Conference, as this also required British concurrence.

Orders for the attack were issued to General Carl Spaatz on 25 July under the signature of General Thomas T. Handy, the acting chief of staff, since Marshall was at the Potsdam Conference with Truman. It read:

That day, Truman noted in his diary that:

Potsdam Declaration 

The 16 July success of the Trinity Test in the New Mexico desert exceeded expectations. On 26 July, Allied leaders issued the Potsdam Declaration, which outlined the terms of surrender for Japan. The declaration was presented as an ultimatum and stated that without a surrender, the Allies would attack Japan, resulting in "the inevitable and complete destruction of the Japanese armed forces and just as inevitably the utter devastation of the Japanese homeland". The atomic bomb was not mentioned in the communiqué.

On 28 July, Japanese papers reported that the declaration had been rejected by the Japanese government. That afternoon, Prime Minister Kantarō Suzuki declared at a press conference that the Potsdam Declaration was no more than a rehash (yakinaoshi) of the Cairo Declaration, that the government intended to ignore it (mokusatsu, "kill by silence"), and that Japan would fight to the end. The statement was taken by both Japanese and foreign papers as a clear rejection of the declaration. Emperor Hirohito, who was waiting for a Soviet reply to non-committal Japanese peace feelers, made no move to change the government position. Japan's willingness to surrender remained conditional on the preservation of the kokutai (Imperial institution and national polity), assumption by the Imperial Headquarters of responsibility for disarmament and demobilization, no occupation of the Japanese Home Islands, Korea or Formosa, and delegation of the punishment of war criminals to the Japanese government.

At Potsdam, Truman agreed to a request from Winston Churchill that Britain be represented when the atomic bomb was dropped. William Penney and Group Captain Leonard Cheshire were sent to Tinian, but found that LeMay would not let them accompany the mission. All they could do was send a strongly worded signal to Wilson.

Bombs 
The Little Boy bomb, except for the uranium payload, was ready at the beginning of May 1945. There were two uranium-235 components, a hollow cylindrical projectile and a cylindrical target insert. The projectile was completed on 15 June, and the target insert on 24 July. The projectile and eight bomb pre-assemblies (partly assembled bombs without the powder charge and fissile components) left Hunters Point Naval Shipyard, California, on 16 July aboard the cruiser , and arrived on Tinian on 26 July. The target insert followed by air on 30 July, accompanied by Commander Francis Birch from Project Alberta. Responding to concerns expressed by the 509th Composite Group about the possibility of a B-29 crashing on takeoff, Birch had modified the Little Boy design to incorporate a removable breech plug that would permit the bomb to be armed in flight.

The first plutonium core, along with its polonium-beryllium urchin initiator, was transported in the custody of Project Alberta courier Raemer Schreiber in a magnesium field carrying case designed for the purpose by Philip Morrison. Magnesium was chosen because it does not act as a neutron reflector. The core departed from Kirtland Army Air Field on a C-54 transport aircraft of the 509th Composite Group's 320th Troop Carrier Squadron on 26 July, and arrived at North Field 28 July. Three Fat Man high-explosive pre-assemblies, designated F31, F32, and F33, were picked up at Kirtland on 28 July by three B-29s, two from the 393d Bombardment Squadron plus one from the 216th Army Air Force Base Unit, and transported to North Field, arriving on 2 August.

Hiroshima

Hiroshima during World War II 

At the time of its bombing, Hiroshima was a city of industrial and military significance. A number of military units were located nearby, the most important of which was the headquarters of Field Marshal Shunroku Hata's Second General Army, which commanded the defense of all of southern Japan, and was located in Hiroshima Castle. Hata's command consisted of some 400,000 men, most of whom were on Kyushu where an Allied invasion was correctly anticipated. Also present in Hiroshima were the headquarters of the 59th Army, the 5th Division and the 224th Division, a recently formed mobile unit. The city was defended by five batteries of 70 mm and 80 mm (2.8 and 3.1 inch) anti-aircraft guns of the 3rd Anti-Aircraft Division, including units from the 121st and 122nd Anti-Aircraft Regiments and the 22nd and 45th Separate Anti-Aircraft Battalions. In total, an estimated 40,000 Japanese military personnel were stationed in the city.

Hiroshima was a supply and logistics base for the Japanese military. The city was a communications center, a key port for shipping, and an assembly area for troops. It supported a large war industry, manufacturing parts for planes and boats, for bombs, rifles, and handguns. The center of the city contained several reinforced concrete buildings and lighter structures. Outside the center, the area was congested by a dense collection of small timber workshops set among Japanese houses. A few larger industrial plants lay near the outskirts of the city. The houses were constructed of timber with tile roofs, and many of the industrial buildings were also built around timber frames. The city as a whole was highly susceptible to fire damage. It was the second largest city in Japan after Kyoto that was still undamaged by air raids, primarily because it lacked the aircraft manufacturing industry that was the XXI Bomber Command's priority target. On 3 July, the Joint Chiefs of Staff placed it off limits to bombers, along with Kokura, Niigata and Kyoto.

The population of Hiroshima had reached a peak of over 381,000 earlier in the war but prior to the atomic bombing, the population had steadily decreased because of a systematic evacuation ordered by the Japanese government. At the time of the attack, the population was approximately 340,000–350,000. Residents wondered why Hiroshima had been spared destruction by firebombing. Some speculated that the city was to be saved for U.S. occupation headquarters, others thought perhaps their relatives in Hawaii and California had petitioned the U.S. government to avoid bombing Hiroshima. More realistic city officials had ordered buildings torn down to create long, straight firebreaks. These continued to be expanded and extended up to the morning of 6 August 1945.

Bombing of Hiroshima 
Hiroshima was the primary target of the first atomic bombing mission on 6 August, with Kokura and Nagasaki as alternative targets. The 393d Bombardment Squadron B-29 Enola Gay, named after Tibbets's mother and piloted by Tibbets, took off from North Field, Tinian, about six hours' flight time from Japan. Enola Gay was accompanied by two other B-29s: The Great Artiste, commanded by Major Charles Sweeney, which carried instrumentation, and a then-nameless aircraft later called Necessary Evil, commanded by Captain George Marquardt. Necessary Evil was the photography aircraft.

Parsons, who was in command of the mission, armed the bomb in flight to minimize the risks during takeoff. He had witnessed four B-29s crash and burn at takeoff, and feared that a nuclear explosion would occur if a B-29 crashed with an armed Little Boy on board. His assistant, Second Lieutenant Morris R. Jeppson, removed the safety devices 30 minutes before reaching the target area.

During the night of 5–6 August, Japanese early warning radar detected the approach of numerous American aircraft headed for the southern part of Japan. Radar detected 65 bombers headed for Saga, 102 bound for Maebashi, 261 en route to Nishinomiya, 111 headed for Ube and 66 bound for Imabari. An alert was given and radio broadcasting stopped in many cities, among them Hiroshima. The all-clear was sounded in Hiroshima at 00:05. About an hour before the bombing, the air raid alert was sounded again, as Straight Flush flew over the city. It broadcast a short message which was picked up by Enola Gay. It read: "Cloud cover less than 3/10th at all altitudes. Advice: bomb primary." The all-clear was sounded over Hiroshima again at 07:09.

At 08:09, Tibbets started his bomb run and handed control over to his bombardier, Major Thomas Ferebee. Enola Gay traveled  before it felt the shock waves from the blast.

The weapon was considered very inefficient, with only 1.7 percent of its material fissioning.

Only Tibbets, Parsons, and Ferebee knew of the nature of the weapon; the others on the bomber were only told to expect a blinding flash and given black goggles. "It was hard to believe what we saw", Tibbets told reporters, while Parsons said "the whole thing was tremendous and awe-inspiring... the men aboard with me gasped 'My God'." He and Tibbets compared the shockwave to "a close burst of ack-ack fire".

Events on the ground 
People on the ground reported a —a brilliant flash of light—followed by a —a loud booming sound. Some 70,000–80,000 people, around 30 percent of the population of Hiroshima at the time, were killed by the blast and resultant firestorm, and another 70,000 were injured. It is estimated that as many as 20,000 Japanese military personnel were killed. U.S. surveys estimated that  of the city were destroyed. Japanese officials determined that 69 percent of Hiroshima's buildings were destroyed and another 6 to 7 percent damaged.

Some of the reinforced concrete buildings in Hiroshima had been very strongly constructed because of the earthquake danger in Japan, and their framework did not collapse even though they were fairly close to the blast center. Since the bomb detonated in the air, the blast was directed more downward than sideways, which was largely responsible for the survival of the Prefectural Industrial Promotional Hall, now commonly known as the Genbaku (A-bomb) dome, which was only  from ground zero (the hypocenter). The ruin was named Hiroshima Peace Memorial and was made a UNESCO World Heritage Site in 1996 over the objections of the United States and China, which expressed reservations on the grounds that other Asian nations were the ones who suffered the greatest loss of life and property, and a focus on Japan lacked historical perspective. As in other Japanese cities, the firebreaks proved ineffective.

The air raid warning had been cleared at 07:31, and many people were outside, going about their activities. Eizō Nomura was the closest known survivor, being in the basement of a reinforced concrete building (it remained as the Rest House after the war) only  from ground zero at the time of the attack. He died in 1982, aged 84. Akiko Takakura was among the closest survivors to the hypocenter of the blast. She was in the solidly-built Bank of Hiroshima only  from ground-zero at the time of the attack.

Over 90 percent of the doctors and 93 percent of the nurses in Hiroshima were killed or injured—most had been in the downtown area which received the greatest damage. The hospitals were destroyed or heavily damaged. Only one doctor, Terufumi Sasaki, remained on duty at the Red Cross Hospital. Nonetheless, by early afternoon the police and volunteers had established evacuation centres at hospitals, schools and tram stations, and a morgue was established in the Asano library. Survivors of the blast gathered for medical treatment, but many would die before receiving any help, leaving behind rings of corpses around hospitals.

Most elements of the Japanese Second General Army headquarters were undergoing physical training on the grounds of Hiroshima Castle, barely  from the hypocenter. The attack killed 3,243 troops on the parade ground. The communications room of Chugoku Military District Headquarters that was responsible for issuing and lifting air raid warnings was located in a semi-basement in the castle. Yoshie Oka, a Hijiyama Girls High School student who had been mobilized to serve as a communications officer, had just sent a message that the alarm had been issued for Hiroshima and neighboring Yamaguchi, when the bomb exploded. The city is in a state of near-total destruction."

Since Mayor Senkichi Awaya had been killed while eating breakfast with his son and granddaughter at the mayoral residence, Field Marshal Shunroku Hata, who was only slightly wounded, took over the administration of the city, and coordinated relief efforts. Many of his staff had been killed or fatally wounded, including Lieutenant Colonel Yi U, a prince of the Korean imperial family who was serving as a General Staff Officer. Hata's senior surviving staff officer was the wounded Colonel Kumao Imoto, who acted as his chief of staff. Soldiers from the undamaged Hiroshima Ujina Harbor used s, intended to repel the American invasion, to collect the wounded and take them down the rivers to the military hospital at Ujina. Trucks and trains brought in relief supplies and evacuated survivors from the city.

Most died instantly, although two were reported to have been executed by their captors, and two prisoners badly injured by the bombing were left next to the Aioi Bridge by the Kempei Tai, where they were stoned to death. Eight U.S. prisoners of war killed as part of the medical experiments program at Kyushu University were falsely reported by Japanese authorities as having been killed in the atomic blast as part of an attempted cover up.

Japanese realization of the bombing 

The Tokyo control operator of the Japan Broadcasting Corporation noticed that the Hiroshima station had gone off the air. He tried to re-establish his program by using another telephone line, but it too had failed. About 20 minutes later the Tokyo railroad telegraph center realized that the main line telegraph had stopped working just north of Hiroshima. From some small railway stops within  of the city came unofficial and confused reports of a terrible explosion in Hiroshima. All these reports were transmitted to the headquarters of the Imperial Japanese Army General Staff.

Military bases repeatedly tried to call the Army Control Station in Hiroshima. The complete silence from that city puzzled the General Staff; they knew that no large enemy raid had occurred and that no sizable store of explosives was in Hiroshima at that time. A young officer was instructed to fly immediately to Hiroshima, to land, survey the damage, and return to Tokyo with reliable information for the staff. It was felt that nothing serious had taken place and that the explosion was just a rumor.

The staff officer went to the airport and took off for the southwest. After circling the city to survey the damage they landed south of the city, where the staff officer, after reporting to Tokyo, began to organize relief measures. Tokyo's first indication that the city had been destroyed by a new type of bomb came from President Truman's announcement of the strike, sixteen hours later.

Events of 7–9 August 

After the Hiroshima bombing, Truman issued a statement announcing the use of the new weapon. He stated, "We may be grateful to Providence" that the German atomic bomb project had failed, and that the United States and its allies had "spent two billion dollars on the greatest scientific gamble in history—and won". Truman then warned Japan: "If they do not now accept our terms, they may expect a rain of ruin from the air, the like of which has never been seen on this earth. Behind this air attack will follow sea and land forces in such numbers and power as they have not yet seen and with the fighting skill of which they are already well aware." This was a widely broadcast speech picked up by Japanese news agencies.

The 50,000-watt standard wave station on Saipan, the OWI radio station, broadcast a similar message to Japan every 15 minutes about Hiroshima, stating that more Japanese cities would face a similar fate in the absence of immediate acceptance of the terms of the Potsdam Declaration and emphatically urged civilians to evacuate major cities. Radio Japan, which continued to extoll victory for Japan by never surrendering, had informed the Japanese of the destruction of Hiroshima by a single bomb. Prime Minister Suzuki felt compelled to meet the Japanese press, to whom he reiterated his government's commitment to ignore the Allies' demands and fight on.

Soviet Foreign Minister Vyacheslav Molotov had informed Tokyo of the Soviet Union's unilateral abrogation of the Soviet–Japanese Neutrality Pact on 5 April. At two minutes past midnight on 9 August, Tokyo time, Soviet infantry, armor, and air forces had launched the Manchurian Strategic Offensive Operation. Four hours later, word reached Tokyo of the Soviet Union's official declaration of war. The senior leadership of the Japanese Army began preparations to impose martial law on the nation, with the support of Minister of War Korechika Anami, to stop anyone attempting to make peace.

On 7 August, a day after Hiroshima was destroyed, Dr. Yoshio Nishina and other atomic physicists arrived at the city, and carefully examined the damage. They then went back to Tokyo and told the cabinet that Hiroshima was indeed destroyed by a nuclear weapon. Admiral Soemu Toyoda, the Chief of the Naval General Staff, estimated that no more than one or two additional bombs could be readied, so they decided to endure the remaining attacks, acknowledging "there would be more destruction but the war would go on". American Magic codebreakers intercepted the cabinet's messages.

Purnell, Parsons, Tibbets, Spaatz, and LeMay met on Guam that same day to discuss what should be done next. Since there was no indication of Japan surrendering, they decided to proceed with dropping another bomb. Parsons said that Project Alberta would have it ready by 11 August, but Tibbets pointed to weather reports indicating poor flying conditions on that day due to a storm, and asked if the bomb could be readied by 9 August. Parsons agreed to try to do so.

Nagasaki

Nagasaki during World War II 

The city of Nagasaki had been one of the largest seaports in southern Japan, and was of great wartime importance because of its wide-ranging industrial activity, including the production of ordnance, ships, military equipment, and other war materials. The four largest companies in the city were Mitsubishi Shipyards, Electrical Shipyards, Arms Plant, and Steel and Arms Works, which employed about 90 percent of the city's labor force, and accounted for 90 percent of the city's industry. Although an important industrial city, Nagasaki had been spared from firebombing because its geography made it difficult to locate at night with AN/APQ-13 radar.

Unlike the other target cities, Nagasaki had not been placed off limits to bombers by the Joint Chiefs of Staff's 3 July directive, and was bombed on a small scale five times. During one of these raids on 1 August, a number of conventional high-explosive bombs were dropped on the city. A few hit the shipyards and dock areas in the southwest portion of the city, and several hit the Mitsubishi Steel and Arms Works. By early August, the city was defended by the 134th Anti-Aircraft Regiment of the 4th Anti-Aircraft Division with four batteries of  anti-aircraft guns and two searchlight batteries.

In contrast to Hiroshima, almost all of the buildings were of old-fashioned Japanese construction, consisting of timber or timber-framed buildings with timber walls (with or without plaster) and tile roofs. Many of the smaller industries and business establishments were also situated in buildings of timber or other materials not designed to withstand explosions. Nagasaki had been permitted to grow for many years without conforming to any definite city zoning plan; residences were erected adjacent to factory buildings and to each other almost as closely as possible throughout the entire industrial valley. On the day of the bombing, an estimated 263,000 people were in Nagasaki, including 240,000 Japanese residents, 10,000 Korean residents, 2,500 conscripted Korean workers, 9,000 Japanese soldiers, 600 conscripted Chinese workers, and 400 Allied prisoners of war in a camp to the north of Nagasaki.

Bombing of Nagasaki 

Responsibility for the timing of the second bombing was delegated to Tibbets. Scheduled for 11 August against Kokura, the raid was moved earlier by two days to avoid a five-day period of bad weather forecast to begin on 10 August. Three bomb pre-assemblies had been transported to Tinian, labeled F-31, F-32, and F-33 on their exteriors. On 8 August, a dress rehearsal was conducted off Tinian by Sweeney using Bockscar as the drop airplane. Assembly F-33 was expended testing the components and F-31 was designated for the 9 August mission.

At 03:47 Tinian time (GMT+10), 02:47 Japanese time, on the morning of 9 August 1945, Bockscar, flown by Sweeney's crew, lifted off from Tinian island with the Fat Man, with Kokura as the primary target and Nagasaki the secondary target. The mission plan for the second attack was nearly identical to that of the Hiroshima mission, with two B-29s flying an hour ahead as weather scouts and two additional B-29s in Sweeney's flight for instrumentation and photographic support of the mission. Sweeney took off with his weapon already armed but with the electrical safety plugs still engaged.

During pre-flight inspection of Bockscar, the flight engineer notified Sweeney that an inoperative fuel transfer pump made it impossible to use  of fuel carried in a reserve tank. This fuel would still have to be carried all the way to Japan and back, consuming still more fuel. Replacing the pump would take hours; moving the Fat Man to another aircraft might take just as long and was dangerous as well, as the bomb was live. Tibbets and Sweeney therefore elected to have Bockscar continue the mission.

This time Penney and Cheshire were allowed to accompany the mission, flying as observers on the third plane, Big Stink, flown by the group's operations officer, Major James I. Hopkins, Jr. Observers aboard the weather planes reported both targets clear. When Sweeney's aircraft arrived at the assembly point for his flight off the coast of Japan, Big Stink failed to make the rendezvous. According to Cheshire, Hopkins was at varying heights including  higher than he should have been, and was not flying tight circles over Yakushima as previously agreed with Sweeney and Captain Frederick C. Bock, who was piloting the support B-29 The Great Artiste. Instead, Hopkins was flying  dogleg patterns. Though ordered not to circle longer than fifteen minutes, Sweeney continued to wait for Big Stink for forty minutes. Before leaving the rendezvous point, Sweeney consulted Ashworth, who was in charge of the bomb. As commander of the aircraft, Sweeney made the decision to proceed to the primary, the city of Kokura.

After exceeding the original departure time limit by nearly a half-hour, Bockscar, accompanied by The Great Artiste, proceeded to Kokura, thirty minutes away. The delay at the rendezvous had resulted in clouds and drifting smoke over Kokura from fires started by a major firebombing raid by 224 B-29s on nearby Yahata the previous day. Additionally, the Yahata Steel Works intentionally burned coal tar, to produce black smoke. The clouds and smoke resulted in 70 percent of the area over Kokura being covered, obscuring the aiming point. Three bomb runs were made over the next 50 minutes, burning fuel and exposing the aircraft repeatedly to the heavy defenses around Kokura, but the bombardier was unable to drop visually. By the time of the third bomb run, Japanese anti-aircraft fire was getting close, and Second Lieutenant Jacob Beser, who was monitoring Japanese communications, reported activity on the Japanese fighter direction radio bands.

With fuel running low because of the failed fuel pump, Bockscar and The Great Artiste headed for their secondary target, Nagasaki. Fuel consumption calculations made en route indicated that Bockscar had insufficient fuel to reach Iwo Jima and would be forced to divert to Okinawa, which had become entirely Allied-occupied territory only six weeks earlier. After initially deciding that if Nagasaki were obscured on their arrival the crew would carry the bomb to Okinawa and dispose of it in the ocean if necessary, Ashworth agreed with Sweeney's suggestion that a radar approach would be used if the target was obscured. At about 07:50 Japanese time, an air raid alert was sounded in Nagasaki, but the "all clear" signal was given at 08:30. When only two B-29 Superfortresses were sighted at 10:53 Japanese Time (GMT+9), the Japanese apparently assumed that the planes were only on reconnaissance and no further alarm was given.

A few minutes later at 11:00 Japanese Time, The Great Artiste dropped instruments attached to three parachutes. These instruments also contained an unsigned letter to Professor Ryokichi Sagane, a physicist at the University of Tokyo who studied with three of the scientists responsible for the atomic bomb at the University of California, Berkeley, urging him to tell the public about the danger involved with these weapons of mass destruction. The messages were found by military authorities but not turned over to Sagane until a month later. In 1949, one of the authors of the letter, Luis Alvarez, met with Sagane and signed the letter.

At 11:01 Japanese Time, a last-minute break in the clouds over Nagasaki allowed Bockscars bombardier, Captain Kermit Beahan, to visually sight the target as ordered.

Bockscar flew on to Okinawa, arriving with only sufficient fuel for a single approach. Sweeney tried repeatedly to contact the control tower for landing clearance, but received no answer. He could see heavy air traffic landing and taking off from Yontan Airfield. Firing off every flare on board to alert the field to his emergency landing, the Bockscar came in fast, landing at  instead of the normal . The number two engine died from fuel starvation as he began the final approach. Touching down on only three engines midway down the landing strip, Bockscar bounced up into the air again for about  before slamming back down hard. The heavy B-29 slewed left and towards a row of parked B-24 bombers before the pilots managed to regain control. Its reversible propellers were insufficient to slow the aircraft adequately, and with both pilots standing on the brakes, Bockscar made a swerving 90-degree turn at the end of the runway to avoid running off it. A second engine died from fuel exhaustion before the plane came to a stop.

Following the mission, there was confusion over the identification of the plane. The first eyewitness account by war correspondent William L. Laurence of The New York Times, who accompanied the mission aboard the aircraft piloted by Bock, reported that Sweeney was leading the mission in The Great Artiste. He also noted its "Victor" number as 77, which was that of Bockscar. Laurence had interviewed Sweeney and his crew, and was aware that they referred to their airplane as The Great Artiste. Except for Enola Gay, none of the 393d's B-29s had yet had names painted on the noses, a fact which Laurence himself noted in his account. Unaware of the switch in aircraft, Laurence assumed Victor 77 was The Great Artiste, which was in fact, Victor 89.

Events on the ground 

Although the bomb was more powerful than the one used on Hiroshima, its effects were confined by hillsides to the narrow Urakami Valley. Of 7,500 Japanese employees who worked inside the Mitsubishi Munitions plant, including "mobilized" students and regular workers, 6,200 were killed. Some 17,000–22,000 others who worked in other war plants and factories in the city died as well. Casualty estimates for immediate deaths vary widely, ranging from 22,000 to 75,000. At least 35,000–40,000 people were killed and 60,000 others injured. In the days and months following the explosion, more people died from their injuries. Because of the presence of undocumented foreign workers, and a number of military personnel in transit, there are great discrepancies in the estimates of total deaths by the end of 1945; a range of 60,000 to 80,000 can be found in various studies.

Unlike Hiroshima's military death toll, only 150 Japanese soldiers were killed instantly, including 36 from the 134th AAA Regiment of the 4th AAA Division. At least eight Allied prisoners of war (POWs) died from the bombing, and as many as thirteen may have died. The eight confirmed deaths included a British POW, Royal Air Force Corporal Ronald Shaw, and seven Dutch POWs. One American POW, Joe Kieyoomia, was in Nagasaki at the time of the bombing but survived, reportedly having been shielded from the effects of the bomb by the concrete walls of his cell. There were 24 Australian POWs in Nagasaki, all of whom survived.

About 58 percent of the Mitsubishi Arms Plant was damaged, and about 78 percent of the Mitsubishi Steel Works. The Mitsubishi Electric Works suffered only 10 percent structural damage as it was on the border of the main destruction zone. The Nagasaki Arsenal was destroyed in the blast. Although many fires likewise burnt following the bombing, in contrast to Hiroshima where sufficient fuel density was available, no firestorm developed in Nagasaki as the damaged areas did not furnish enough fuel to generate the phenomenon. Instead, ambient wind pushed the fire spread along the valley.

As in Hiroshima, the bombing badly dislocated the city's medical facilities. A makeshift hospital was established at the Shinkozen Primary School, which served as the main medical centre. The trains were still running, and evacuated many victims to hospitals in nearby towns. A medical team from a naval hospital reached the city in the evening, and fire-fighting brigades from the neighboring towns assisted in fighting the fires. Takashi Nagai was a doctor working in the radiology department of Nagasaki Medical College Hospital. He received a serious injury that severed his right temporal artery, but joined the rest of the surviving medical staff in treating bombing victims.

Plans for more atomic attacks on Japan 

Groves expected to have another "Fat Man" atomic bomb ready for use on 19 August, with three more in September and a further three in October; a second Little Boy bomb (using U-235) would not be available until December 1945. On 10 August, he sent a memorandum to Marshall in which he wrote that "the next bomb ... should be ready for delivery on the first suitable weather after 17 or 18 August." Marshall endorsed the memo with the hand-written comment, "It is not to be released over Japan without express authority from the President", something Truman had requested that day. This modified the previous order that the target cities were to be attacked with atomic bombs "as made ready". There was already discussion in the War Department about conserving the bombs then in production for Operation Downfall, and Marshall suggested to Stimson that the remaining cities on the target list be spared attack with atomic bombs.

Two more Fat Man assemblies were readied, and scheduled to leave Kirtland Field for Tinian on 11 and 14 August, and Tibbets was ordered by LeMay to return to Albuquerque, New Mexico, to collect them. At Los Alamos, technicians worked 24 hours straight to cast another plutonium core. Although cast, it still needed to be pressed and coated, which would take until 16 August. Therefore, it could have been ready for use on 19 August. Unable to reach Marshall, Groves ordered on his own authority on 13 August that the core should not be shipped.

Surrender of Japan and subsequent occupation 

Until 9 August, Japan's war council still insisted on its four conditions for surrender. The full cabinet met at 14:30 on 9 August, and spent most of the day debating surrender. Anami conceded that victory was unlikely, but argued in favor of continuing the war nonetheless. The meeting ended at 17:30, with no decision having been reached. Suzuki went to the palace to report on the outcome of the meeting, where he met with Kōichi Kido, the Lord Keeper of the Privy Seal of Japan. Kido informed him that the emperor had agreed to hold an imperial conference, and gave a strong indication that the emperor would consent to surrender on condition that kokutai be preserved. A second cabinet meeting was held at 18:00. Only four ministers supported Anami's position of adhering to the four conditions, but since cabinet decisions had to be unanimous, no decision was reached before it ended at 22:00.

Calling an imperial conference required the signatures of the prime minister and the two service chiefs, but the Chief Cabinet Secretary Hisatsune Sakomizu had already obtained signatures from Toyoda and General Yoshijirō Umezu in advance, and he reneged on his promise to inform them if a meeting was to be held. The meeting commenced at 23:50. No consensus had emerged by 02:00 on 10 August, but the emperor gave his "sacred decision", authorizing the Foreign Minister, Shigenori Tōgō, to notify the Allies that Japan would accept their terms on one condition, that the declaration "does not comprise any demand which prejudices the prerogatives of His Majesty as a Sovereign ruler."

On 12 August, the Emperor informed the imperial family of his decision to surrender. One of his uncles, Prince Asaka, then asked whether the war would be continued if the kokutai could not be preserved. Hirohito simply replied, "Of course." As the Allied terms seemed to leave intact the principle of the preservation of the Throne, Hirohito recorded on 14 August his capitulation announcement which was broadcast to the Japanese nation the next day despite an attempted military coup d'état by militarists opposed to the surrender.

In his declaration's fifth paragraph, Hirohito solely mentions the duration of the conflict; and did not explicitly mention the Soviets as a factor for surrender:

The sixth paragraph by Hirohito specifically mentions the use of nuclear ordnance devices against Japan by the United States, from the aspect of the unprecedented damage they caused:

The seventh paragraph gives the reason for the ending of hostilities against the Allies:

In his "Rescript to the Soldiers and Sailors" delivered on 17 August, Hirohito did not refer to the atomic bombs or possible human extinction, and instead described the Soviet declaration of war as "endangering the very foundation of the Empire's existence."

Reportage 

On 10 August 1945, the day after the Nagasaki bombing, military photographer Yōsuke Yamahata, correspondent Higashi, and artist Yamada arrived in the city with instructions to record the destruction for propaganda purposes. Yamahata took scores of photographs, and on 21 August, they appeared in Mainichi Shimbun, a popular Japanese newspaper. After Japan's surrender and the arrival of American forces, copies of his photographs were seized amid the ensuing censorship, but some records have survived.

Leslie Nakashima, a former United Press (UP) journalist, filed the first personal account of the scene to appear in American newspapers. He observed that large numbers of survivors continued to die from what later became recognized as radiation poisoning. On 31 August, The New York Times published an abbreviated version of his 27 August UP article. Nearly all references to uranium poisoning were omitted. An editor's note was added to say that, according to American scientists, "the atomic bomb will not have any lingering after-effects."

Wilfred Burchett was also one of the first Western journalists to visit Hiroshima after the bombing. He arrived alone by train from Tokyo on 2 September, defying the traveling ban put in place on Western correspondents. Burchett's Morse code dispatch, "The Atomic Plague", was printed by the Daily Express newspaper in London on 5 September 1945. The reports from Nakashima and Burchett informed the public for the first time of the gruesome effects of radiation and nuclear fallout—radiation burns and radiation poisoning, sometimes lasting more than thirty days after the blast. Burchett especially noted that people were dying "horribly" after bleeding from orifices, and their flesh would rot away from the injection holes where vitamin A was administered, to no avail.

The New York Times then apparently reversed course and ran a front-page story by Bill Lawrence confirming the existence of a terrifying affliction in Hiroshima, where many had symptoms such as hair loss and vomiting of blood before dying. Lawrence had gained access to the city as part of a press junket promoting the U.S. Army Air Force. Some reporters were horrified by the scene, however, referring to what they saw as a "death laboratory" littered with "human guinea pigs". General MacArthur found the reporting to have turned from good PR into bad PR and threatened to court martial the entire group. He withdrew Burchett's press accreditation and expelled the journalist from the occupation zones. The authorities also accused him of being under the sway of Japanese propaganda and later suppressed another story, on the Nagasaki bombing, by George Weller of the Chicago Daily News. Less than a week after his New York Times story was published, Lawrence also backtracked and dismissed the reports on radiation sickness as Japanese efforts to undermine American morale.

A member of the U.S. Strategic Bombing Survey, Lieutenant Daniel McGovern, used a film crew to document the effects of the bombings in early 1946. The film crew shot  of film, resulting in a three-hour documentary titled The Effects of the Atomic Bombs Against Hiroshima and Nagasaki. The documentary included images from hospitals showing the human effects of the bomb; it showed burned-out buildings and cars, and rows of skulls and bones on the ground. It was classified "secret" for the next 22 years. Motion picture company Nippon Eigasha started sending cameramen to Nagasaki and Hiroshima in September 1945. On 24 October 1945, a U.S. military policeman stopped a Nippon Eigasha cameraman from continuing to film in Nagasaki. All Nippon Eigasha reels were confiscated by the American authorities, but they were requested by the Japanese government, and declassified. The public release of film footage of the city post-attack, and some research about the effects of the attack, was restricted during the occupation of Japan, but the Hiroshima-based magazine, Chugoku Bunka, in its first issue published on 10 March 1946, devoted itself to detailing the damage from the bombing.

The book Hiroshima, written by Pulitzer Prize winner John Hersey, which was originally published in article form in the popular magazine The New Yorker, on 31 August 1946, is reported to have reached Tokyo in English by January 1947, and the translated version was released in Japan in 1949. It narrated the stories of the lives of six bomb survivors from immediately prior to, and months after, the dropping of the Little Boy bomb. Beginning in 1974, a compilation of drawings and artwork made by the survivors of the bombings began to be compiled, with completion in 1977, and under both book and exhibition format, it was titled The Unforgettable Fire.

The bombing amazed Otto Hahn and other German atomic scientists, whom the British held at Farm Hall in Operation Epsilon. Hahn stated that he had not believed an atomic weapon "would be possible for another twenty years"; Werner Heisenberg did not believe the news at first. Carl Friedrich von Weizsäcker said "I think it's dreadful of the Americans to have done it. I think it is madness on their part", but Heisenberg replied, "One could equally well say 'That's the quickest way of ending the war'". Hahn was grateful that the German project had not succeeded in developing "such an inhumane weapon"; Karl Wirtz observed that even if it had, "we would have obliterated London but would still not have conquered the world, and then they would have dropped them on us".

Hahn told the others, "Once I wanted to suggest that all uranium should be sunk to the bottom of the ocean". The Vatican agreed; L'Osservatore Romano expressed regret that the bomb's inventors did not destroy the weapon for the benefit of humanity. Rev. Cuthbert Thicknesse, the dean of St Albans, prohibited using St Albans Abbey for a thanksgiving service for the war's end, calling the use of atomic weapons "an act of wholesale, indiscriminate massacre". Nonetheless, news of the atomic bombing was greeted enthusiastically in the U.S.; a poll in Fortune magazine in late 1945 showed a significant minority of Americans (23 percent) wishing that more atomic bombs could have been dropped on Japan. The initial positive response was supported by the imagery presented to the public (mainly the powerful images of the mushroom cloud). During this time in America, it was a common practice for editors to keep graphic images of death out of films, magazines, and newspapers.

Post-attack casualties 

An estimated 90,000 to 140,000 people in Hiroshima (up to 39 percent of the population) and 60,000 to 80,000 people in Nagasaki (up to 32 percent of the population) died in 1945, though the number which died immediately as a result of exposure to the blast, heat, or due to radiation, is unknown. One Atomic Bomb Casualty Commission report discusses 6,882 people examined in Hiroshima and 6,621 people examined in Nagasaki, who were largely within  of the hypocenter, who suffered injuries from the blast and heat but died from complications frequently compounded by acute radiation syndrome (ARS), all within about 20 to 30 days. Many people not injured by the blast eventually died within that timeframe as well after suffering from ARS. At the time, the doctors had no idea what the cause was and were unable to effectively treat the condition. Midori Naka was the first death officially certified to be the result of radiation poisoning or, as it was referred to by many, the "atomic bomb disease". It was unappreciated at the time but the average radiation dose that would kill approximately 50 percent of adults (the LD50) was approximately halved; that is, smaller doses were made more lethal when the individual experienced concurrent blast or burn polytraumatic injuries. Conventional skin injuries that cover a large area frequently result in bacterial infection; the risk of sepsis and death is increased when a usually non-lethal radiation dose moderately suppresses the white blood cell count.

In the spring of 1948, the Atomic Bomb Casualty Commission (ABCC) was established in accordance with a presidential directive from Truman to the National Academy of Sciences–National Research Council to conduct investigations of the late effects of radiation among the survivors in Hiroshima and Nagasaki. In 1956, the ABCC published The Effect of Exposure to the Atomic Bombs on Pregnancy Termination in Hiroshima and Nagasaki. The ABCC became the Radiation Effects Research Foundation (RERF) on 1 April 1975. A binational organization run by both the United States and Japan, the RERF is still in operation today.

Cancer increases 
Cancers do not immediately emerge after exposure to radiation; instead, radiation-induced cancer has a minimum latency period of some five years and above, and leukemia some two years and above, peaking around six to eight years later. Dr Jarrett Foley published the first major reports on the significant increased incidence of the latter among survivors. Almost all cases of leukemia over the following 50 years were in people exposed to more than 1Gy. In a strictly dependent manner dependent on their distance from the hypocenter, in the 1987 Life Span Study, conducted by the Radiation Effects Research Foundation, a statistical excess of 507 cancers, of undefined lethality, were observed in 79,972 hibakusha who had still been living between 1958 and 1987 and who took part in the study. As the epidemiology study continues with time, the RERF estimates that, from 1950 to 2000, 46 percent of leukemia deaths which may include Sadako Sasaki and 11 percent of solid cancers of unspecified lethality were likely due to radiation from the bombs or some other post-attack city effects, with the statistical excess being 200 leukemia deaths and 1,700 solid cancers of undeclared lethality. Both of these statistics being derived from the observation of approximately half of the total survivors, strictly those who took part in the study. A meta-analysis from 2016 found that radiation exposure increases cancer risk, but also that the average lifespan of survivors was reduced by only a few months compared to those not exposed to radiation.

Birth defect investigations 
While during the preimplantation period, that is one to ten days following conception, intrauterine radiation exposure of "at least 0.2 Gy" can cause complications of implantation and death of the human embryo. The number of miscarriages caused by the radiation from the bombings, during this radiosensitive period, is not known.

James V. Neel led the study which found that the overall number of birth defects was not significantly higher among the children of survivors who were pregnant at the time of the bombings. He also studied the longevity of the children who survived the bombings of Hiroshima and Nagasaki, reporting that between 90 and 95 percent were still living 50 years later.

While the National Academy of Sciences raised the possibility that Neel's procedure did not filter the Kure population for possible radiation exposure which could bias the results, overall, a statistically insignificant increase in birth defects occurred directly after the bombings of Nagasaki and Hiroshima when the cities were taken as wholes, in terms of distance from the hypocenters.

In 1985, Johns Hopkins University geneticist James F. Crow examined Neel's research and confirmed that the number of birth defects was not significantly higher in Hiroshima and Nagasaki. Many members of the ABCC and its successor Radiation Effects Research Foundation (RERF) were still looking for possible birth defects among the survivors decades later, but found no evidence that they were significantly common among the survivors or inherited in the children of survivors.

Investigations into brain development 

Despite the small sample size of 1,600 to 1,800 persons who came forth as prenatally exposed at the time of the bombings, that were both within a close proximity to the two hypocenters, to survive the in utero absorption of a substantial dose of radiation and then the malnourished post-attack environment, data from this cohort does support the increased risk of severe mental retardation (SMR), that was observed in some 30 individuals, with SMR being a common outcome of the aforementioned microencephaly. While a lack of statistical data, with just 30 individuals out of 1,800, prevents a definitive determination of a threshold point, the data collected suggests a threshold intrauterine or fetal dose for SMR, at the most radiosensitive period of cognitive development, when there is the largest number of undifferentiated neural cells (8 to 15 weeks post-conception) to begin at a threshold dose of approximately "0.09" to "0.15" Gy, with the risk then linearly increasing to a 43-percent rate of SMR when exposed to a fetal dose of 1 Gy at any point during these weeks of rapid neurogenesis.

However either side of this radiosensitive age, none of the prenatally exposed to the bombings at an age less than 8 weeks, that is prior to synaptogenesis or at a gestational age more than 26 weeks "were observed to be mentally retarded", with the condition therefore being isolated to those solely of 8–26 weeks of age and who absorbed more than approximately "0.09" to "0.15" Gy of prompt radiation energy.

Examination of the prenatally exposed in terms of IQ performance and school records, determined the beginning of a statistically significant reduction in both, when exposed to greater than 0.1 to 0.5 gray, during the same gestational period of 8–25 weeks. However outside this period, at less than 8 weeks and greater than 26 after conception, "there is no evidence of a radiation-related effect on scholastic performance."

The reporting of doses in terms of absorbed energy in units of grays and rads – rather than the biologically significant, biologically weighted sievert in both the SMR and cognitive performance data – is typical. The reported threshold dose variance between the two cities is suggested to be a manifestation of the difference between X-ray and neutron absorption, with Little Boy emitting substantially more neutron flux, whereas the Baratol that surrounded the core of Fat Man filtered or shifted the absorbed neutron-radiation profile, so that the dose of radiation energy received in Nagasaki was mostly that from exposure to X-rays/gamma rays. Contrast this to the environment within 1500 meters of the hypocenter at Hiroshima, where the in-utero dose depended more on the absorption of neutrons which have a higher biological effect per unit of energy absorbed. From the radiation dose reconstruction work, which were also informed by the 1962 BREN Tower Japanese city analog, the estimated dosimetry at Hiroshima still has the largest uncertainty as the Little Boy bomb design was never tested before deployment or afterward, therefore the estimated radiation profile absorbed by individuals at Hiroshima had required greater reliance on calculations than the Japanese soil, concrete and roof-tile measurements which began to reach accurate levels and thereby inform researchers, in the 1990s.

Many other investigations into cognitive outcomes, such as schizophrenia as a result of prenatal exposure, have been conducted with "no statistically significant linear relationship seen". There is a suggestion that in the most extremely exposed, those who survived within a kilometer or so of the hypocenters, a trend emerges akin to that seen in SMR, though the sample size is too small to determine with any significance.

Hibakusha 

The survivors of the bombings are called , a Japanese word that literally translates to "explosion-affected people". The Japanese government has recognized about 650,000 people as hibakusha. , 118,935 were still alive, mostly in Japan. The government of Japan recognizes about one percent of these as having illnesses caused by radiation. The memorials in Hiroshima and Nagasaki contain lists of the names of the hibakusha who are known to have died since the bombings. Updated annually on the anniversaries of the bombings, the memorials record the names of 526,000 hibakusha; 333,907 in Hiroshima and 192,310 in Nagasaki.

If they discuss their background, hibakusha and their children were (and still are) victims of fear-based discrimination and exclusion when it comes to prospects of marriage or work due to public ignorance about the consequences of radiation sickness or that the low doses that the majority received were less than a routine diagnostic x-ray, much of the public however persist with the belief that the hibakusha carry some hereditary or even contagious disease. This is despite the fact that no statistically demonstrable increase of birth defects/congenital malformations was found among the later conceived children born to survivors of the nuclear weapons used at Hiroshima and Nagasaki, or indeed has been found in the later conceived children of cancer survivors who had previously received radiotherapy.
The surviving women of Hiroshima and Nagasaki, that could conceive, who were exposed to substantial amounts of radiation, went on and had children with no higher incidence of abnormalities/birth defects than the rate which is observed in the Japanese average.
A study of the long-term psychological effects of the bombings on the survivors found that even 17–20 years after the bombings had occurred survivors showed a higher prevalence of anxiety and somatization symptoms.

Double survivors 
Perhaps as many as 200 people from Hiroshima sought refuge in Nagasaki. The 2006 documentary Twice Survived: The Doubly Atomic Bombed of Hiroshima and Nagasaki documented 165 nijū hibakusha (lit. double explosion-affected people), nine of whom claimed to be in the blast zone in both cities. On 24 March 2009, the Japanese government officially recognized Tsutomu Yamaguchi as a double hibakusha. He was confirmed to be  from ground zero in Hiroshima on a business trip when the bomb was detonated. He was seriously burnt on his left side and spent the night in Hiroshima. He arrived at his home city of Nagasaki on 8 August, the day before the bombing, and he was exposed to residual radiation while searching for his relatives. He was the first officially recognized survivor of both bombings. He died on 4 January 2010, at age 93, of stomach cancer.

Korean survivors 

During the war, Japan brought as many as 670,000 Korean conscripts to Japan to work as forced labor. About 5,000–8,000 Koreans were killed in Hiroshima and another 1,500–2,000 died in Nagasaki. For many years, Korean survivors had a difficult time fighting for the same recognition as Hibakusha as afforded to all Japanese survivors, a situation which resulted in the denial of the free health benefits to them in Japan. Most issues were eventually addressed in 2008 through lawsuits.

Memorials

Hiroshima 
Hiroshima was subsequently struck by Typhoon Ida on 17 September 1945. More than half the bridges were destroyed, and the roads and railroads were damaged, further devastating the city. The population increased from 83,000 soon after the bombing to 146,000 in February 1946. The city was rebuilt after the war, with help from the national government through the Hiroshima Peace Memorial City Construction Law passed in 1949. It provided financial assistance for reconstruction, along with land donated that was previously owned by the national government and used for military purposes. In 1949, a design was selected for the Hiroshima Peace Memorial Park. Hiroshima Prefectural Industrial Promotion Hall, the closest surviving building to the location of the bomb's detonation, was designated the Hiroshima Peace Memorial. The Hiroshima Peace Memorial Museum was opened in 1955 in the Peace Park. Hiroshima also contains a Peace Pagoda, built in 1966 by Nipponzan-Myōhōji.

On January 27, 1981, the Atomic Bombing Relic Selecting Committee  of Hiroshima announced to build commemorative plaques at nine historical sites related to the bombing in the year. Genbaku Dome, Shima Hospital (hypocenter),  all unveiled plaques with historical photographs and descriptions. The rest sites planned including Hondō Shopping Street, Motomachi No.2 Army Hospital site,  and Hiroshima Station. The committee also planned to establish 30 commemorative plaques in three years.

Nagasaki 
Nagasaki was also rebuilt after the war, but was dramatically changed in the process. The pace of reconstruction was initially slow, and the first simple emergency dwellings were not provided until 1946. The focus on redevelopment was the replacement of war industries with foreign trade, shipbuilding and fishing. This was formally declared when the Nagasaki International Culture City Reconstruction Law was passed in May 1949. New temples were built, as well as new churches owing to an increase in the presence of Christianity. Some of the rubble was left as a memorial, such as a torii at Sannō Shrine, and an arch near ground zero. New structures were also raised as memorials, such as the Nagasaki Atomic Bomb Museum, which was opened in the mid-1990s.

Debate over bombings 

The role of the bombings in Japan's surrender, and the ethical, legal, and military controversies surrounding the United States' justification for them have been the subject of scholarly and popular debate. On one hand, it has been argued that the bombings caused the Japanese surrender, thereby preventing casualties that an invasion of Japan would have involved. Stimson talked of saving one million casualties. The naval blockade might have starved the Japanese into submission without an invasion, but this would also have resulted in many more Japanese deaths.

However, critics of the bombings have cited a belief that atomic weapons are fundamentally immoral, that the bombings were war crimes, and that they constituted state terrorism. Others, such as historian Tsuyoshi Hasegawa, argued that the entry of the Soviet Union into the war against Japan "played a much greater role than the atomic bombs in inducing Japan to surrender because it dashed any hope that Japan could terminate the war through Moscow's mediation". A view among critics of the bombings, popularized by American historian Gar Alperovitz in 1965, is the idea of atomic diplomacy: that the United States used nuclear weapons to intimidate the Soviet Union in the early stages of the Cold War. James Orr wrote that this idea became the accepted position in Japan and that it may have played some part in the decision making of the US government.

Legal considerations

The Hague Conventions of 1899 and 1907, which address the codes of wartime conduct on land and at sea, were adopted before the rise of air power. Despite repeated diplomatic attempts to update international humanitarian law to include aerial warfare, it was not updated before the outbreak of World War II. The absence of specific international humanitarian law did not mean aerial warfare was not covered under the laws of war, but rather that there was no general agreement of how to interpret those laws. This means that aerial bombardment of civilian areas in enemy territory by all major belligerents during World War II was not prohibited by positive or specific customary international humanitarian law.

In 1963 the bombings were subjected to judicial review in Ryuichi Shimoda v. The State. The District Court of Tokyo declined to rule on the legality of nuclear weapons in general but, in the judgment of the court, the atomic bombings of both Hiroshima and Nagasaki were illegal under international law as it existed at that time, as an indiscriminate bombardment of undefended cities. The court denied the appellants compensation on the grounds that the Japanese government had waived the right for reparations from the U.S. government under the Treaty of San Francisco.

Legacy 

The manner in which World War II ended cast a long shadow over international relations for decades afterwards. By 30 June 1946, there were components for nine atomic bombs in the US arsenal, all Fat Man devices identical to the one used in the bombing of Nagasaki. The nuclear weapons were handmade devices, and a great deal of work remained to improve their ease of assembly, safety, reliability and storage before they were ready for production. There were also many improvements to their performance that had been suggested or recommended, but that had not been possible under the pressure of wartime development. The Chairman of the Joint Chiefs of Staff, Fleet Admiral William D. Leahy, decried the use of the atomic bombs as adopting "an ethical standard common to the barbarians of the Dark Ages", but in October 1947 he reported a military requirement for 400 bombs.

The American monopoly on nuclear weapons lasted four years before the Soviet Union detonated an atomic bomb in September 1949. The United States responded with the development of the hydrogen bomb, a nuclear weapon a thousand times as powerful as the bombs that devastated Hiroshima and Nagasaki. Such ordinary fission bombs would henceforth be regarded as small tactical nuclear weapons. By 1986, the United States had 23,317 nuclear weapons and the Soviet Union had 40,159. In early 2019, more than 90% of the world's 13,865 nuclear weapons were owned by the United States and Russia.

By 2020, nine nations had nuclear weapons, but Japan was not one of them. Japan reluctantly signed the Treaty on the Non-Proliferation of Nuclear Weapons in February 1970, but is still sheltered under the American nuclear umbrella. American nuclear weapons were stored on Okinawa, and sometimes in Japan itself, albeit in contravention of agreements between the two nations. Lacking the resources to fight the Soviet Union using conventional forces, the NATO came to depend on the use of nuclear weapons to defend itself during the Cold War, a policy that became known in the 1950s as the New Look. In the decades after Hiroshima and Nagasaki, the United States would threaten to use its nuclear weapons many times.

On 7 July 2017, more than 120 countries voted to adopt the UN Treaty on the Prohibition of Nuclear Weapons. Elayne Whyte Gómez, President of the UN negotiations on the nuclear ban treaty, said, "the world has been waiting for this legal norm for 70 years," since the atomic bombings of Hiroshima and Nagasaki in August 1945. , Japan has not signed the treaty.

Notes

References

Further reading 

 
 
 
 
 
 
 
 
 
 
 
 
 
 O'Brien, Phillips Payson. "The Joint Chiefs of Staff, the atom bomb, the American Military Mind and the end of the Second World War." Journal of Strategic Studies 42.7 (2019): 971–991. online

Historiography 
 Kort, Michael. "The Historiography of Hiroshima: The Rise and Fall of Revisionism." New England Journal of History 64.1 (2007): 31–48. online
 Newman, Robert P. "Hiroshima and the Trashing of Henry Stimson" The New England Quarterly, 71#1 (1998), pp. 5–32 in JSTOR

External links

Decision

Effects

Archives

Bibliographies

Commemoration 
 Hiroshima National Peace Memorial Hall For The Atomic Bomb Victims
 Nagasaki National Peace Memorial Hall For The Atomic Bomb Victims
 Hiroshima Peace Memorial Museum
 Hiroshima and Nagasaki: A Look Back at the US Atomic Bombing 64 Years Later – video by Democracy Now!
 Hiroshima & Nagasaki Remembered 2005 website commemorating 60th anniversary

 
1945 in Japan
1945 in military history
1945 in the environment
Articles containing video clips
August 1945 events in Asia
Explosions in 1945
History of the Manhattan Project